Éric Minardi (born 18 March 1956) is a French politician from the National Rally who has been a Member of the European Parliament since 2022.

On 16 March 2023 Minardi withdrew his Te Nati Rassemblement national polynésien (RNP) party from Hau Ma'ohi.

References 

1956 births
Living people
National Rally (France) politicians
21st-century French politicians
National Rally (France) MEPs
MEPs for France 2019–2024
French Polynesian politicians